Oscar Peterson Plays Count Basie is a 1956 album by Oscar Peterson, of music associated with Count Basie.

Track listing
 "Lester Leaps In" (Lester Young) – 3:58
 "Easy Does It" (Sy Oliver, Young) – 6:28
 "9:20 Special" (William Engvick, Earle Warren) – 3:40
 "Jumpin' at the Woodside" (Count Basie) – 5:42
 "Blues for Basie" (Oscar Peterson) – 3:34
 "Broadway" (Billy Bird, Teddy McRae, Henri Woode) – 4:31
 "Blue and Sentimental" (Basie, Mack David, Jerry Livingston) – 2:29
 "Topsy" (Edgar Battle, Eddie Durham) – 4:22
 "One O'Clock Jump" (Basie) – 5:49
 "Jive at Five" (Basie, Harry "Sweets" Edison) – 4:11

Personnel

Performance
 Oscar Peterson – piano
 Ray Brown – double bass
 Herb Ellis - guitar
 Buddy Rich - drums

References

1956 albums
Oscar Peterson albums
Albums produced by Norman Granz
Clef Records albums
Count Basie tribute albums